Engenni may be,

Engenni people
Engenni language